OpenLink may refer to:

 Norfolk Open Link, a wifi connectivity programme in Norwich, UK
 Texas Instruments' OpenLink project, "an initiative focused on providing a wide range of wireless connectivity solutions for Linux-based operating systems"